Petronella Catharina de Jong (born 26 July 1970 in Sint Jacobiparochie) is a sailor from the Netherlands. De Jong represented her country at the 2004 Summer Olympics in Athens. With helmsman Annelies Thies and fellow crew member Annemieke Bes De Jong took 4th place in the Yngling.

Further reading

2004 Olympics (Athens)

References

Living people
1970 births
People from Het Bildt
Sportspeople from Friesland
Dutch female sailors (sport)
Sailors at the 2004 Summer Olympics – Yngling
Olympic sailors of the Netherlands